The Hayes and Harlington by-election of 17 June 1971 was held after the death of Labour Member of Parliament (MP) Arthur Skeffington. The seat was retained by Labour.

Results

References

Hayes and Harlington by-election
Hayes and Harlington by-election
Hayes and Harlington by-election
Hayes and Harlington,1971
Hayes and Harlington,1971